Ryan Thomas Cooney (born 26 February 2000) is an English professional footballer who plays as a defender for Morecambe.

Career

Bury
Cooney was born in Manchester, Greater Manchester. He joined Bury at the age of nine, progressing through the club's youth academy and being made captain of the youth team. Cooney was promoted to the first-team squad in the 2016–17 season while still a scholar because of injuries. He made his debut on 26 August 2017, playing against Rochdale in a League One match which ended 0–0. He signed a two-year professional contract with the club in October 2018. He made a total of 29 appearances in all competitions having been given the opportunity of first team football by manager Ryan Lowe. He got used to spending time around older, more experienced players and he adapted on and off the pitch. Despite gaining promotion from EFL League Two in the 2018–19 season, Bury's future looked bleak amid financial problems and Cooney was hoping for a move.

Burnley
Cooney signed for Premier League club Burnley on 15 July 2019 on a one-year contract with the option of a further year, initially joining the under-23 team. In the first half of the season he was a regular part of Steve Stone's side and contributed towards a 17-match unbeaten run. He became a part of Burnley's first-team bubble until the end of the 2019–20 season, along with a number of youngsters, following the return to football post-lockdown. He was rewarded with a new one-year contract in June 2020.

Morecambe
On 2 January 2020, he was sent out on loan for the first time when he joined League Two side Morecambe until the end of the season along with Adam Phillips. There was frustration in March 2020, as COVID-19 brought the loan to an abrupt halt as Cooney had been beginning to settle in and was playing and performing consistently. Cooney and Phillips spoke during the lockdown and agreed that they would return to Morecambe if the opportunity arose in the following season, describing manager Derek Adams as a big influence.
On 11 August 2020, Cooney re-joined Morecambe on loan until the end of the season along with Phillips. Morecambe made a good start to the season and were top of the league after five games with four wins.
On 24 June 2021, it was announced that Cooney had signed for Morecambe on a free transfer on a two-year deal after turning down the offer of a new contract at Burnley.

Career statistics

Honours

Morecambe
EFL League Two play-offs: 2021

References

External links
Profile on the Burnley F.C. website

2000 births
Living people
Footballers from Manchester
English footballers
Association football defenders
Bury F.C. players
Burnley F.C. players
Morecambe F.C. players
English Football League players